The Ecological Sanitation Research Programme (EcoSanRes) is a research and capacity development program that aims to develop and promote sustainable sanitation in the developing world through capacity development and knowledge management as a contribution to equity, health, poverty alleviation, and improved environmental quality.

EcoSanRes was funded by the Swedish International Development Cooperation Agency (Sida) from 2001-2010. It was hosted by the Stockholm Environment Institute which is a partner of the Sustainable Sanitation Alliance.

See also 

 sanitation
 ecological sanitation
 sustainable sanitation

External links 
 EcoSanRes programme website

Environmental organizations based in Sweden
Sustainability organizations